The Indianapolis mayoral election of 2011 took place on November 8, 2011. Voters elected the Mayor of Indianapolis, members of the Indianapolis City-County Council, as well as several other local officials. Incumbent Republican Greg Ballard was seeking a second term. Democrats nominated former deputy mayor Melina Kennedy to run against Ballard. Ballard defeated Kennedy 51% to 47%.

The Indianapolis City-County elections took place alongside the mayoral election, with Democrats taking a 16–13 majority. This marked the first time in Indianapolis history that a Republican mayor would lead with a Democratic council.

Candidates

Republican party
Greg Ballard, incumbent mayor

Democratic party
Melina Kennedy, former Deputy Mayor for Economic Development

Defeated in the primary
Sam Carson
Ron Gibson
Brian Williams

Removed from ballot
Bob Kern

Libertarian party
Chris Bowen

Campaign
Melina Kennedy was described as the "overwhelming favorite" to win the Democratic primary, and succeeded in doing so.

The campaign was the most expensive in Indianapolis history, with the candidates raising a combined $6 million. Representative André Carson, Sam Carson's nephew, endorsed Melina Kennedy. Kennedy was also endorsed by The Indianapolis Star and Indianapolis Metropolitan Police Department.

Polling

Election results

References

External links
 Greg Ballard for Mayor
 Melina Kennedy for Mayor

2011
2011 United States mayoral elections
2011 Indiana elections